George Washington is a series of outdoor bronze busts depicting George Washington by Avard Fairbanks, located on the George Washington University campus in Washington, D.C.

History
Copyrighted in 1975 and dedicated on February 16, 1993, the sculpture measures approximately 46 x 32 x 27 inches, with a granite base measuring approximately 68 x 42 1/2 x 33 inches.

See also
 1975 in art
 List of public art in Washington, D.C., Ward 2

References

1975 sculptures
Busts in Washington, D.C.
Busts of presidents of the United States
Foggy Bottom
George Washington in art
George Washington University
Monuments and memorials to George Washington in the United States
Outdoor sculptures in Washington, D.C.